The Diocese of Erie is a Latin Church ecclesiastical territory or diocese of the Catholic Church in western Pennsylvania.  It was founded on July 29, 1853. It is one of seven suffragan dioceses in Pennsylvania that make up the Ecclesiastical Province of Philadelphia, which is headed by the Archdiocese of Philadelphia.

Statistics 
Erie is geographically the largest diocese in Pennsylvania, covering . Erie diocese covers 13 counties in Northwestern Pennsylvania. About 220,000 Catholics (74,000 families) reside in the diocese. They educate 14,000 children and youth in their religious education programs.

Bishops

Bishops of Erie
 Michael O'Connor, S.J. (1853–1854), appointed Bishop of Pittsburgh
 Joshua Maria Young (1854–1866)
 Tobias Mullen (1868–1899)
 John Edmund Fitzmaurice (1899–1920) 
 John Mark Gannon (1920–1966), elevated to Archbishop (ad personam) in 1953
 John Francis Whealon (1966–1968), appointed Archbishop of Hartford
 Alfred Michael Watson (1969–1982)
 Michael Joseph Murphy (1982–1990)
 Donald Walter Trautman (1990–2012)
 Lawrence T. Persico (2012–present)

Auxiliary Bishops
 John Mark Gannon (1917–1920), appointed Bishop of Erie
 Edward Peter McManaman (1948–1964)
 Alfred Michael Watson (1965–1969), appointed Bishop of Erie

Other priests of this diocese who became Bishops
 Thomas Francis Brennan, appointed Bishop of Dallas in 1891
 Lawrence Eugene Brandt, appointed Bishop of Greensburg in 2004 
 Richard Thomas Guilfoyle, appointed Bishop of Altoona in 1936
Mark Leonard Bartchak, appointed Bishop of Altoona-Johnstown in 2011

Vicariates 
The diocese is divided into three vicariates:
The Eastern Vicariate consists of parishes in Cameron, Clearfield, Elk, Jefferson,  McKean, and Potter counties. It has deaneries at Bradford, Clearfield, Dubois, and St. Mary's.
The Northern Vicariate consists of parishes in Erie, part of Forest, and Warren counties. It has Erie East and Erie West deaneries in Erie, Pennsylvania, plus a deanery in Warren.
The Western Vicariate consists of parishes in Clarion, Crawford, part of Forest, Mercer, and Venango. It has deaneries in Meadville, Oil City, and Sharon.

Parishes
Historically significant parishes include:

Oldest existing parishes by church dedication dates:

  St. Francis Assisi, Clearfield (Oldest parish community in diocese; original church dedicated by Bishop Francis Patrick Kenrick of Philadelphia in 1832)
  St. Philip, Crossingville (Original church dedicated by Bishop Kenrick, 1834)
  St. Nicholas of Tolentino, Crates (Original church dedicated by Bishop Kenrick, 1835)
  St. Michael, the Archangel, Fryburg (Original church dedicated by Bishop Kenrick, 1836)
  St. Hippolyte, Frenchtown (Original church dedicated by Bishop Kenrick, 1837)

Other historically-significant parishes:

 St. Mary's, Erie (German origins, pioneer parish)
 St. Patrick's Pro-Cathedral, Erie (Pioneer parish)
 St. Peter Cathedral, Erie (Significant edifice)
 St. Stanislaus, Erie (Polish origins)
 St. Mary, St. Marys (Bavarian German origins, over 150 years old)

There are 120 parishes in the Erie diocese today, encompassing 151 churches.

Administrative offices 
The diocesan offices are located at St. Mark Catholic Center in Erie, Pennsylvania.

Reports of sex abuse

In early 2016, a grand jury investigation, led by Pennsylvania Attorney General Josh Shapiro, began an inquiry into sexual abuse by Catholic clergy in six Pennsylvania dioceses:  Allentown, Scranton, Harrisburg, Pittsburgh, Greensburg, and Erie.  The Diocese of Altoona-Johnstown and the Archdiocese of Philadelphia were not included, as they had been the subjects of earlier investigations.

In April 2018, the Diocese of Erie published a list of 34 priests and 17 laypeople who had been "credibly accused" of sexually abusing children.  By July, the list had grown to include 64 names.

On July 27, 2018, the Pennsylvania Supreme Court ordered that a redacted copy of the grand jury report be released to the public. The grand jury report was published on August 14, 2018, and revealed that at least 41 clergy in Diocese of Erie were accused of sexually abusing children. Thirty nine of the accused had their names publicly shown and only two had their names redacted. Bishop Persico, who received praise from Shapiro, acknowledged there was a cover-up in the church. Former bishop Donald Trautman, who was criticized in the report alongside former bishop Michael Murphy for allowing "predator priest" Chester Gawronski to remain in the Diocese despite numerous allegations of sexual abuse, criticized Shapiro's portrayal of him in the report and noted that he had established guidelines in 1993 concerning how to deal with sexual abuse and later established the Diocesan Office for the Protection of Children and Youth in 2003 to protect children from sex abuse.  Nevertheless, it was acknowledged that both Murphy and Trautman reassigned Gawronski multiple times between 1987 and 2002 and that Trautman renewed Gawronski's five-year term as a chaplain in St Mary's Home in Erie in 2001.

Former Erie priest and current bishop of Altoona-Johnstown Mark Bartchak was also criticized in the report for his handling of 2005 investigation against former Erie priest William Presley.  Bartchak was assigned by the Vatican during this time to investigate claims against Presley, who served in the Erie Diocese between 1963 and 1986, and continuously re-interviewed a male victim who previously disclosed his alleged abuse to the diocese in 1982, 1987 and 2002.  On August 25, 2005, Bartchak sent a secret memo to then-Erie Bishop Donald Walter Trautman.  Parts of the memo read "I was not surprised to learn from other witnesses from the Elk County area, that there are likely to be other victims" and that "it is likely that there may be others who were also of the age for the offenses to be considered delicts, but to what end is it necessary to follow every lead?"  Bartchak also stated in another secret memo following a meeting with Trautman on August 29, 2005: "Bishop Trautman decided that in order to preclude further scandal, these additional witnesses should not be contacted, especially given the fact that it is not likely that they will lead to information concerning delicts involving minors under 16 years of age."

On October 17, 2018, Pennsylvania Attorney General Josh Shapiro accepted a guilty plea from former Diocese of Erie priest David Lee Poulson on charges of corruption of minors and endangering the welfare of children. Poulson had been accused of repeatedly sexually abusing one boy and attempting to sexually abuse another. Both are third-degree felonies, but also require a 10 year registration period as a sex offender. On January 11, 2019, Poulson, who was also one of two priests in the state of Pennsylvania charged following the grand jury report, was given a 2 1/2 to 14 year prison sentence, which he immediately began serving. On March 15, 2019, Bishop Persico announced that Pope Francis had issued an order defrocking Poulson on March 5, 2019.

On July 18, 2020, it was revealed that the Diocese of Erie was undergoing a potential new sex abuse lawsuit alleging that Diocese's compensation fund had yet to pay victims of abuse allegedly committed at St. Hedwig Catholic Church and its long-closed school. On July 24, 2020, a woman alleging that Rev. Michael G. Barletta, who was among the 301 “predator priests” named in the grand jury report, sued the Diocese of Erie on allegations that it shielded Barletta from potential prosecution after Barletta molested her when she was in grade school in the 1970s.  By this point in time, at least three other sex abuse lawsuits were filed against the Diocese of Erie in between July 15, 2020, as well. On August 16, 2020, it was revealed that a total of 21 lawsuits were filed against the Diocese of Erie since the 2018 grand jury report was released.

Religious institutes

Men
Benedictines
Franciscans
Marists
Redemptorists

Women
Bridgettines
Felicians
Sisters of the Humility of Mary
Sisters of St. Joseph
Sisters of Mercy

Charities
Erie Diocese has many charities throughout all of the parishes. There are 9 main charities within the diocese: Better Homes for Erie, 
Christ the King Manor,
Counseling & Adoption Services, 
Foreign Missions, 
Harborcreek Youth Services, 
Saint John XXIII Home, Donate to Mission of Friendship, 
Parish Care and Concern, 
Prince of Peace Center, 
Refugee Ministry, 
St. Martin Center.

Schooling
The diocese has 33 elementary schools and 2 middle schools.

The following high schools are operated by the diocese:
 Cathedral Preparatory School, Erie
 Central Catholic High School, DuBois
 Elk County Catholic High School, St. Marys
 Kennedy Catholic High School, Hermitage
 Mercyhurst Preparatory School, Erie
 Venango Catholic High School, Oil City
 Villa Maria Academy, Erie

The diocese also founded Gannon University in Erie.

Cemeteries 
 Calvary Cemetery and Mausoleum, 3325 West Lake Road, Erie
 Gate of Heaven Cemetery and Mausoleum, 5711 West Lake Road, Erie
 Mary, Queen of Peace Cemetery and Mausoleum, 6000 Lake Pleasant Road, Erie
 Trinity Cemetery 2971 West Lake Road, Erie

See also Erie Diocesan Cemeteries.

See also

 Catholic Church by country
 Catholic Church in the United States
 Ecclesiastical Province of Philadelphia
 Global organisation of the Catholic Church
 List of Roman Catholic archdioceses (by country and continent)
 List of Roman Catholic dioceses (alphabetical) (including archdioceses)
 List of Roman Catholic dioceses (structured view) (including archdioceses)
 List of the Catholic dioceses of the United States

References

External links

Roman Catholic Diocese of Erie Official Site
Catholic Encyclopedia's Erie Diocese page

 
Erie, Pennsylvania
Erie
Erie
Erie
1853 establishments in Pennsylvania